The Columbian is a 517-foot-tall (158 m) skyscraper in Chicago, Illinois, United States. It was constructed from 2005 to 2008 and has 47 floors, 225 units and four elevators. It is the tallest brick-clad building, and 76th tallest building, in Chicago.

See also
List of tallest buildings in Chicago

External links
 
 Skyscraperpage

Residential skyscrapers in Chicago
Residential buildings completed in 2008
2008 establishments in Illinois